Galterud Station is a railway station located at Galterud in the municipality of Sør-Odal in Hedmark, Norway.

History
Galterud station was opened in 1864 as a stopover on the Kongsvinger railway. In 1913, Galterud was upgraded to station status. It was staffed until 1966 when it became remote controlled. The station was shut down on December 9, 2012.

References

Railway stations in Hedmark
Railway stations on the Kongsvinger Line
Railway stations opened in 1864
1864 establishments in Norway